The city of Mari in modern Syria was ruled by several dynasties in the Bronze Age. The history of the city is divided into three kingdoms.

The first kingdom
The Sumerian King List (SKL) records a dynasty of six kings from Mari enjoying hegemony between the dynasty of Adab and the dynasty of Kish. The names of the Mariote kings were damaged on the early copies of the list, and those kings were correlated with historical kings that belonged to the second kingdom. However, an undamaged copy of the list that date to the old Babylonian period was discovered in Shubat-Enlil, and the names bears no resemblance to any of the historically attested monarchs of the second kingdom, indicating that the compilers of the list had an older and probably a legendary dynasty in mind, that predate the second kingdom.

The second kingdom
The chronological order of the kings from the second kingdom era is highly uncertain; nevertheless, it is assumed that the letter of Enna-Dagan lists them in a chronological order. Many of the kings were attested through their own votive objects discovered in the city, and the dates are highly speculative.

The third kingdom
The third kingdom was ruled by two dynasties: the Shakkanakkus and the Lim. For the Shakkanakkus, the lists are incomplete and after Hanun-Dagan who ruled at the end of the Ur era c. 2008 BC (c. 1920 BC Short chronology), they become full of lacunae. Roughly 13 more Shakkanakkus succeeded Hanun-Dagan but only few are known, with the last known one reigning not too long before the reign of Yaggid-Lim who founded the Lim dynasty in c. 1830 BC, which was interrupted by Assyrian occupation in 1796–1776 BC.

Notes

References

Citations

Sources

Kings of Mari
Mari